Zsombor Bévárdi (born 30 January 1999) is a Hungarian professional footballer who plays for Nemzeti Bajnokság I club Debreceni VSC.

Career statistics
.

External links

 
 

1999 births
Living people
People from Siófok
Hungarian footballers
Association football midfielders
Fehérvár FC players
BFC Siófok players
Vasas SC players
Debreceni VSC players
Kaposvári Rákóczi FC players
Nemzeti Bajnokság I players
Hungary youth international footballers
Sportspeople from Somogy County